Frumușica is a commune in Floreşti District, Moldova. It is composed of two villages, Frumușica and Frumușica Nouă (depopulated as of 2014).

References

Communes of Florești District